From Hell to Paradise is the second album by the American country music band the Mavericks. It was released in 1992 on MCA Nashville Records. The only album to feature David Lee Holt on lead guitar comprises ten songs, including re-recordings of four from their first album, The Mavericks (1991): "Mr. Jones", "The End of the Line (Jim Baker)", "This Broken Heart" and "A Better Way".

Two cover songs appear on the album: "Excuse Me (I Think I've Got a Heartache)" and "Hey Good Lookin'", which were previously recorded by Buck Owens and Hank Williams, respectively. The latter cover was one of two singles released, and it peaked at #74 on the Billboard country charts in 1992. The other, "I Got You" b/w "A Better Way", failed to chart.

Critical reception

The Austin American-Statesman wrote that Raul Malo "sings like the reincarnation of Del Shannon, and the Texas twang of guitarist David Holt ... helps offset the production's tendency toward slickness."

Track listing
All songs written by Raul Malo except where noted.
"Mr. Jones" – 3:24
"The End of the Line" – 3:33
"Excuse Me (I Think I've Got a Heartache)" (Buck Owens, Harlan Howard) – 2:38
"This Broken Heart" – 3:45
"I Got You" (Malo, Radney Foster) – 3:11
"From Hell to Paradise" – 4:46
"A Better Way" – 3:49
"Forever Blue" – 3:26
"Hey Good Lookin'" (Hank Williams) – 2:37
"Children" – 5:04

Personnel

The Mavericks
Paul Deakin- drums, vibraphone
David Lee Holt- electric guitar
Raul Malo- bass guitar, 12-string guitar, acoustic guitar, electric guitar, lead vocals, background vocals
Robert Reynolds- bass guitar, background vocals

Additional musicians
The Arvida Middle School Choir- background vocals 
Eddie Bayers- drums
Richard Bennett- acoustic guitar, electric guitar, requinto, tiple
Steve Fishell- dobro, steel guitar
David Hungate- bass guitar
John Barlow Jarvis- piano, organ
John Leventhal- bass guitar, organ
Debbie Spring- fiddle, viola
Martin Stewart- electric guitar, mandolin
Harry Stinson- background vocals
Marty Stuart- mandolin
Cindy Richardson-Walker- background vocals
Dennis Walker- background vocals 
Pete Wasner- piano
Roger White- organ
Homer Willis- harmonica
Dennis Wilson- background vocals

References

The Mavericks albums
1992 albums
MCA Records albums
Albums produced by Richard Bennett (guitarist)